The Rutgers–Princeton Cannon War refers to a series of incidents involving two Revolutionary War cannons and a rivalry between the College of New Jersey in Princeton, New Jersey – now Princeton University – and Rutgers College – now Rutgers University – in New Brunswick, New Jersey.

History
Rutgers and Princeton are both located in Central New Jersey, about 17 miles from each other. Princeton was founded in Elizabeth, New Jersey in 1746 and then relocated to Princeton 10 years later; Rutgers was founded in New Brunswick in 1766. In 1864, Rutgers educators George Cook and David Murray led a successful campaign to designate Rutgers as New Jersey's designated land-grant university, overcoming competition from other colleges in the state, notably Princeton. On November 6, 1869, Rutgers defeated Princeton in New Brunswick at the first intercollegiate football game on a field where Rutgers' College Ave Gymnasium now stands, adding to the rivalry between the two schools.

Two Revolutionary War cannons were left on the Princeton campus at the end of the war, although neither of them were used in the Battle of Princeton, as is often claimed. Big Cannon is located behind Nassau Hall in the center of the quadrangle there, called Cannon Green,  and Little Cannon is situated between Whig and Clio Halls.  For the War of 1812, "Big Cannon" was transported to New Brunswick to help defend the city against potential attack by the British, remaining on the Rutgers campus – where it was used for training during and after the Civil War by Rutgers cadets – until it was taken back to Princeton in 1836 by the "Princeton Blues", a local militia. Unfortunately, the wagon it was being transported in broke down on the outskirts of Princeton, and the cannon did not reach the Princeton campus until 1838 when Leonard Jerome – who would become the maternal grandfather of Winston Churchill – led a large group of students who brought it to Nassau Hall. The cannon was then planted muzzle down in its current location in 1840.

On the night of April 25, 1875 ten members of the Rutgers Class of 1877 set out to steal back "Big Cannon" from Princeton However, they were unable to move it, so instead they returned to New Brunswick with "Little Cannon."  Princeton responded with a raid on Rutgers, stealing some muskets, and the heads of the two colleges exchanged polite but demanding correspondence.  Eventually, a joint committee settled the matter, and "Little Cannon" was returned to Princeton, escorted by the New Brunswick Police Chief.

In October 1946, a contingent of Rutgers men slipped onto the Princeton campus and again tried to steal the famed cannon. This attempt was even more disastrous than the first. They attached one end of a heavy chain to the cannon and the other to their Ford automobile. Surprised by Princeton students and the police, they gunned the engine of the car so hard that the car was torn in half. The Rutgers students managed to escape, but with neither the car nor the cannon.

On the eve of the annual Rutgers-Princeton game in the fall of 1971 the cannon was apparently stolen again.  A 4' x 5' hole some 5 feet deep was found where the cannon sat. Campus police were baffled that the cannon had been taken given its extreme weight.  After crime photos were taken, it appears that a hole had simply been dug next to cannon and the dirt from the hole used to bury it.  Reports appeared in both the Rutgers Targum as well as the New Jersey and Princeton papers.

On January 31, 1976, five Rutgers students and an elderly woman (the grandmother of one of the students) executed their year-long plan in an attempt to recover the cannon. The group opted to create a fictitious New Jersey Citizens Bicentennial Committee (NJCBC) and infiltrate the campus with a phony story.  They found a contact in Princeton and managed to obtain a security pass. That pass, along with the matron who posed as the Chairman of the NJCBC made things look legitimate enough to get their trucks and heavy equipment through security and onto Princeton grounds. A cover letter, which they gave to the security guards read that their committee had secured permission from appropriate university officials to remove the cannon to be taken on a statewide bicentennial tour. But within minutes of digging, a Princeton University Detective approached the group and foiled their plans, declaring "all right you guys, we know you're from Rutgers."  The group later found out why the plan failed. As fate would have it, the detective's wife's friend was secretary of the real New Jersey State Bicentennial Commission.  A phone call by the detectives quickly blew the "cannon-nappers'" cover.  The six were initially accused of malicious mischief, but after pleading "it was only a lark" by the grandmother, all charges were dropped.

The cannon at Princeton is routinely painted red by Rutgers students, particularly in the week leading to Rutgers commencement as well as on other notable Rutgers dates. In February 2010, the war between loyal Rutgers and Princeton students became more than just "the painting of a cannon." Many Rutgers bumper stickers reading "Rutgers, Jersey Roots Global Reach" were placed all over campus.

In November 2011, a group of Rutgers students who went to paint the cannon in Princeton brought a video camera with them and made a documentary about the tradition.  The footage became part of a larger project about the history of the Cannon War and its perception in the minds of current students today. The film "Knights, Tigers, and Cannons. Oh My!" by Zack Morrison premiered at the New Jersey Film Festival in September 2012, and won the award for Best Student Film.

See also
 Princeton–Rutgers rivalry
 Colonial colleges
 History of New Jersey
 List of practical joke topics

References
Notes

Bibliography
 Demarest, William Henry Steele. History of Rutgers College: 1776-1924. (New Brunswick, NJ: Rutgers College, 1924). (No ISBN)
 Lukac, George J. (ed.), Aloud to Alma Mater. (New Brunswick, New Jersey: Rutgers University Press, 1966), 70-73. (No ISBN)
 McCormick, Richard P. Rutgers: a Bicentennial History. (New Brunswick, NJ: Rutgers University Press, 1966). 
 Schmidt, George P. Princeton and Rutgers:  The Two Colonial Colleges of New Jersey. (Princeton, NJ: Van Nostrand, 1964). (No ISBN)
 "Again, War Over A Cannon: Rivals Besmirch Princeton Gun," in Life. Vol. 35, No. 17. October 26, 1953. p. 147

External links
 Rutgers University
 Princeton University
 Knights, Tigers, and Cannons. Oh My!; a documentary about the Rutgers-Princeton Cannon War

Conflicts in 1875
Princeton University
Rutgers University
New Jersey in the American Revolution
Practical jokes
1875 in New Jersey